Marcos Cesar Pontes (born 11 March 1963) is a Brazilian Air Force pilot, engineer, AEB astronaut, politician and author. He became the first South American and the first Lusophone to go into space when he docked onto the International Space Station aboard Soyuz TMA-8 on March 30, 2006.  He is the only Brazilian to have completed the NASA astronaut training program, although he switched to training in Russia after NASA's Space Shuttle program encountered problems. After Jair Bolsonaro's election as President of Brazil in 2018, Pontes was officially nominated to be Minister of Science, Technology and Innovation, a post which he accepted days later and assumed when Bolsonaro's government began. He left the post on 31 March 2022 and in the same year was elected federal senator for his state, São Paulo.

Early life
Pontes was born in the town of Bauru, in the southeastern state of São Paulo. His father Vergílio was a civil servant of the Instituto Brasileiro do Café and his mother Zuleika was clerk of the Rede Ferroviária Federal (RFFSA).

Air Force and Space career

Pontes is one of the most experienced jet pilots in the Brazilian Air Force (FAB), where he holds the rank of Lieutenant-Colonel and has flown more than 2000 hours in 25 different aircraft. 
In June 1998, he was selected by the Brazilian Space Agency to train in the NASA space program after he acquired a space-related background in the Aeronautical Engineering division of the Instituto Tecnológico de Aeronáutica (the Aeronautics Institute of Technology, or "ITA"). He began NASA training in August 1998 and qualified as Space Shuttle Mission Specialist in December 2000. He attended the Naval Postgraduate School of the US Navy in 1998.

Initially, Pontes' maiden space flight was scheduled to be on a Space Shuttle, where he was to help transport the ExPRESS Pallet, which would have been the International Space Station's first Brazilian-made component, into orbit. Negotiations between NASA and AEB (the Brazilian Space Agency) fell through due to budgetary concerns. During the delay, Pontes ran a campaign to pressure the Brazilian government to complete the Express Pallet, and he worked on technical assignments in the Astronaut Office Space Station Operations Branch at NASA. His flight was postponed indefinitely when AEB confirmed that it could not produce the Express Pallet and its components for NASA.

On September 2, 2005, an agreement between the governments of Brazil and Russia was reached which provided for Pontes to train at Star City, near Moscow, to learn about the Soyuz's operational and life-support systems, and to fly to the International Space Station in March 2006.  The agreement, which cost about US$20 million was signed by the presidents of the Brazilian and Russian space agencies, Sérgio Gaudenzi and Anatoli Perminov, respectively.

Pontes' flight coincided with celebrations of the 100th anniversary of Brazilian aviation pioneer Alberto Santos-Dumont's successful flight of a fixed-wing airplane in Paris in October 1906.

On March 30, 2006, Pontes became the first Brazilian and the first native Portuguese-speaking person to go into space, where he stayed on the International Space Station for a week. During his trip, Pontes carried out eight experiments selected by the Brazilian Space Agency. He landed in Kazakhstan on April 8, 2006, with the crew of Expedition 12.

Following the Soyuz mission, Pontes returned to his technical duties for the International Space Station Program at the Johnson Space Center, working with FIESP/SENAI-SP on the development and fabrication of the Brazilian parts for the ISS.

Pontes entered the reserve of the Brazilian Air Force and awaits a new space mission. He is also an Invited Researcher at the Institute for Advanced Studies of the University of São Paulo at São Carlos. He is an ambassador of UNIDO and WorldSkills. Pontes opened an educational foundation and a tourism agency together with the future Brazilian space tourist Marcos Palhares, who will be traveling to space through the Virgin Galactic.

Pontes announced his intention to visit space a second time back in 2009.

Political career
In his 2011 book Missão Cumprida, he also declared that he is interested in a possible candidacy for an unspecified political post in Brazil and he tried to be elected as "Deputado Federal" during the 2014 São Paulo gubernatorial election. In the 2018 São Paulo gubernatorial election he was elected side with Major Olímpio as second alternate in the Senate.

In October 31, Jair Bolsonaro announced that he would be the next Minister of Science and Technology. This choice left the scientific community with polarized opinions, ranging from how the public sees the profession of astronaut in connection with science and the fact that the minister is not an active scientist and researcher, in addition to concern about his lack of political articulation.

Minister of Science
After the disclosure of data on deforestation in the Amazon by INPE, discredited by Bolsonaro, Marcos Pontes called the then President of Inpe Ricardo Galvão to address the way he has been acting in the media and also declared to share "...the strangeness expressed by our President Bolsonaro...". no matter how much he doesn't believe the data to be false.

On August 7, 2019 the resignation of Ricardo Galvão was published after his resignation on August 2. He was exonerated at the request of Bolsonaro. Directors of research centres linked to the Ministry asked Pontes to intercede on behalf of Galvão, something that did not happen.

Military Darcton Policarpo Damião was chosen to take over Inpe on an interim basis.

In July 2020, he tested positive for COVID-19.

In a survey published by Veja magazine in October 2021, it was revealed that the minister had made 107 international trips, had stayed 1 in 3 days away for travel among his nearly 1000 days in office, had spent more than R$ 500,000 (US$ ), and was the minister in the Bolsonaro government who traveled abroad the most. This travel expense becomes relevant after he criticized the government for cutting R$600 million (US$ ) from the Science and Technology Ministry.

Works
Besides his work as an astronaut and Air Force commander, Marcos also authored four books:

He also writes articles on his website. The main themes are motivation and space travel.

Controversies

Critics from National Congress
In 2006, Marcos Pontes returned to Brazil after the Missão Centenário, deciding to enter the Aeronautics reserve. In this sense, the repercussion around the situation became very wide, due to the indignation that was demonstrated by the National Congress. At first, the Palácio do Planalto, AEB (Brazilian Space Agency) and Aeronautics expected that Pontes could offer a stimulus factor to the space program and to new adhesions to the Armed Forces, as well as mentoring and training to new astronauts, justifying an investment of 10 million dollars from the Federal Government, strongly defended by the Lula Government, who even talked to the astronaut in videoconference on the International Space Station: "In few moments in the history of Brazil, we were proud of a Brazilian like we are of you. You, when you departed, reminded me of Ayrton Senna with the national flag," Lula said. After the decision for the inactivity of Marcos Pontes' functions, President Lula did not comment on the choice, which had several frustration pronouncements from other congressmen, such as Walter Pinheiro (PT), at the time member of the House Science and Technology Commission; Alberto Goldman (PSDB), congressman for São Paulo in 2006; Orlando Fantazzini (PSOL) and Sérgio Gaudenzi. In the view of politicians, who expected the return of astronaut learning to the Brazilian Space Program, the entity should create protection mechanisms for possible future investments in other astronauts, taking into account that the services funded by the government are not lost in the private sphere.

Investigation by the Military Prosecutor
In 2006, Pontes was investigated by the Military Prosecutor to determine whether he had violated Article 204 of the Military Penal Code, which prohibits active military involvement in any commercial activity. In the investigation, the MPM inquired about the website Conexão Espacial, owned by the astronaut's press officer, Christiane Gonçalves Corrêa, then owner of the company Portally Eventos e Produções, about the sale of T-shirts and caps with the image of Marcos from 2002 until the date of his departure. In September 2017, documents were released by The Intercept newspaper, which showed Marcos' supposed status as a partner in the company, but which had always been denied by him. After the extinctive prescription of the investigation, Pontes became a majority partner of the company, with 80% of participation, while Christiane Corrêa kept 20% of participation. The mother of the advisor, who owned about 45% of the shares, left the firm after Pontes joined. In August 2018, after the investigation had already prescribed, the appeal against Pontes was tabled and filed away by Supreme Court Minister Rosa Weber.

Gallery

Awards
Marcos received numerous awards through his career.

Brazilian military

Brazilian (non-military)

International

Electoral performance

See also
Timeline of space travel by nationality
List of Ibero-American spacefarers
Brazilian Space Agency
National Institute for Space Research (INPE)
Aeronautics Technological Institute (ITA)
University of São Paulo (USP)
Brazilian General Command for Aerospace Technology (CTA)

References

External links

 Marcos Pontes on Facebook
 Marcos Pontes on Instagram
 Marcos Pontes on Twitter
 

Air Force Technological Institute (ITA)
 Brazilian Space Agency
Marcos Pontes' official website 
Marcos Pontes at TEDxHouston 2013

Brazilian astronauts
Brazilian engineers
1963 births
Living people
People from Bauru
Recipients of the National Order of Merit (Brazil)
Astronaut-politicians
Writers from São Paulo
Liberal Party (Brazil, 2006) politicians
Social Liberal Party (Brazil) politicians
Brazilian Socialist Party politicians
Democrats (Brazil) politicians
Ministers of Science and Technology of Brazil
Spaceflight participants
Brazilian autobiographers
Amateur radio people